The Lok Sabha constituency Chennai Central is one of three constituencies in Chennai, Tamil Nadu. Its Tamil Nadu Parliamentary Constituency number is 4 of 39. Formerly it was known as Madras Central.It is also one of the smallest constituencies in India. The Voter-verified paper audit trail (VVPAT) system with EVMs was used for the first time in this Lok Sabha constituency in 2014 elections.

Assembly segments

2009–present

Before 2009 

Chennai Central Lok Sabha constituency is composed of the following assembly segments:

Members of the Parliament

Election results

2019

2014

2009

General Election 2004

General Election 1999

See also
 Chennai
 List of Constituencies of the Lok Sabha
 Dravida Munnetra Kazhagam
 AIADMK

References

Lok Sabha Members

External links
Chennai Central lok sabha constituency election 2019 date and schedule

Lok Sabha constituencies in Tamil Nadu
Politics of Chennai